The Estadio Corona is a stadium in Torreón, Coahuila, México, and the home stadium of Santos Laguna of Liga MX.

History 
It was completed in 2009, it has a standard capacity of 30,000, with 20,000 for special events. The stadium's total cost was US$100 million. The stadium replaced the older Estadio Corona, built in 1970 with a capacity of just 18,000. The stadium is part of the Territorio Santos Modelo.

Inauguration

The inauguration of the stadium took place on November 11, 2009, with a football match between Santos Laguna and Santos FC. Before the game, New Orleans Saints cheerleaders, and a concert by singer Ricky Martin preceded the event. The party included some of the club's great players, including Jorge Campos, René Higuita, Franco Baresi, Gabriel Omar Batistuta, George Weah, Enzo Francescoli, and Bebeto, as well as Pelé, who was responsible for giving the opening kickoff. The FIFA president at the time, Joseph Blatter, was also present. The opening statement was given by the President of Mexico Felipe Calderón, accompanied by Coahuila Governor Humberto Moreira. The first goal was scored by Vicente Matias Vuoso in the 6th minute of the game.

2011 Shooting 
On Saturday, August 20, 2011, a first division football match between Monarcas Morelia and Santos Laguna was suspended due to gunfire outside the stadium. During the 40th minute gunshots were heard and players, coaches, staff from both teams and referees ran for cover. Thousands of spectators ran onto the field or went under the seats to protect themselves. The shootout happened outside the stadium when three vehicles refused to stop at a checkpoint and started shooting. Nobody inside the stadium was injured but one policeman outside the stadium was injured.

Facilities 

The Estadio Corona is the most important part of the complex of the Territorio Santos Modelo (TSM), which has the following facilities:
Capacity for 30,000 spectators, divided into 5 levels.
It consists of 112 Suites and 2 Superpalcos.
Press Room for 50 people, press box for 170 journalists.
Area for people with disabilities.
Ballroom and events for 500 people at Star Lounge.
RockSport gym, overlooking the pitch.
Offices and Laguna Azteca TV studios.
Restaurant La Chopería, Corona Corona Club Bar and Lounge.
Auditorium.
Trophy Room.
Shop Santos, by Innova Sport.
2 Main and 2 Preliminaries dressing room.
Dressing room for three referees.
Commissioners Office.
Antidoping room.
Cabin.
Administrative Offices of Club Santos Laguna.
Parish of All Saints.
Santos Soccer School Lala.
Youth divisions.
Clubhouse.
High Performance Centre (2 synthetic grass tennis courts and 3 ½ natural grass).
2.504 parking spaces.

To date, the Estadio Corona has the best lawn in the country and puts the level of the best stadiums in the world, benefiting fast play and offensive, and the show.

The Parish of All Saints is the first in the world located in a sports and entertainment venue and is the result of donations from the Territorio Santos Modelo, its sponsors and supporters who agree with the idea of giving the faith a space as important as the sport. It has capacity for 400 people, with the All Saints Columbarium hosting 492 niches and belongs to the Diocese of Torreón.

The Parish celebrates its anniversary on November 1. Under the second year, conducted the blessing of the altar in a beautiful Eucharist.

Santos Soccer School-Lala receives 400 children who are in their training camps and sports human formation that transmits the Warriors team Santos Laguna. Santos Soccer School-Lala has an artificial grass court standards approved by FIFA.

The building has youth divisions Santos class rooms and the best areas to prepare future players, following the principles of an institution that strives for excellence to provide complete human beings turned into great athletes. The Club House is home to 40 youth receiving special attention with housing, food, education and fitness.

The High Performance Centre has two tennis FIFA. two-star and three synthetic grass courts and half natural grass, and two gables for free throws and training goalkeepers.

TSM has ample parking for 2,504 cars.

In the Territorio Santos Modelo, concerned about saving and proper use of water, installed a purification plant that collects wastewater from 20,000 homes to process and use it to irrigate the 23 acres of land. This system has 7 tanks also serving 600 bathroom furniture that are within the TSM.

The development of the Territorio Santos Modelo is planned for a second phase, which will consist of:

Hotel: is 5 stars, 120 rooms.
Square shopping and Entertainment: A shopping and entertainment area of over 18,000 square meters.
College sports: A place for young people in general to continue their professional growth with careers linked to sport.

See also
List of football stadiums in Mexico

References

External links
 Official website

Football venues in Mexico
Sports venues in Coahuila
Torreón